Nine Treasures is a folk metal group with members mostly from the autonomous region of Inner Mongolia. Founded in 2010, the group combines traditional Mongolian music with heavy metal, notably using traditional instruments and overtone singing techniques.

History

Origin 
The group was formed in 2010 in Hailar District of Inner Mongolia in China.

The name of the group refers to the nine materials evoked in ancient Mongolian poems as favoring luck (gold, silver, bronze, iron, agate, amber, jade, pearl and coral). The name was proposed by a former member of the group who currently plays in the group Hanggai; the group considers the name auspicious.

In May 2012, the band released their first album 十丈铜嘴 Arvan Ald Guulin Honshoor at Mort Productions Beijing, an extreme metal record label created in 2001 and located in Shijingshan District, China. The album was reissued in 2015 under the title Arvan Ald Guulin Hunshoor for easy export. The reissue was done independently through Bandcamp.

International breakthrough 

In August 2013, the group made a notable appearance at the Wacken Open Air festival where it won the Wacken Metal Battle in China and came second in the Wacken Metal Battle. In December of that year the group released their second work Nine Treasures under an independent label.

During 2014 and 2015, the group spent most of their time on the road for an Asian tour, traveling north to Ulaanbaatar in Mongolia, south to Taiwan, and east to Vladivostok in Russia.

In January 2015 they released their first EP titled Galloping White Horse, produced independently with two new songs and three live tracks. A few days later they released their first live album entitled Live in Beijing recorded from a concert in Beijing a few months before. This album contained the same live tracks as those included in the EP. In October of that year, the group was invited to WOMEX in Budapest and then went on tour in Europe for the first time, performing in the Czech Republic, Poland, Latvia, Germany, Denmark, the Netherlands, and Austria.

In July 2016, Nine Treasures completed their second tour in Europe, visiting Latvia, Poland, Austria, the Czech Republic, Germany, the Netherlands, Portugal, and Slovenia.

In January 2017, the band released their third album titled Wisdom Eyes. It is distributed independently like their other albums on the platform Bandcamp. The band went on tour in Europe between June and July through Austria, Slovenia, Poland, the Czech Republic, Germany, Bulgaria, and Hungary.

Drummer Namra replaced Ding Kai in 2019. Nine Treasures released the single "Bodhicitta" on the 27th of February 2019.

Rebirth
The band were unsatisfied with the recording quality of their previous albums, and opted to re-record songs from all three of their previous albums for the new album Awakening from Dukkha which was released on the 19th of March 2021. Askhan expressed a wish for a new beginning for the band, similar to Pantera. Askhan stated that he would begin writing new material after the album's release in March 2021. With the new album forthcoming, the band removed all of their previous releases from the internet, feeling "ashamed" of their quality. The band subsequently made all of their releases available as free wave file downloads.

Awakening from Dukkha was reviewed by Metal Hammer and received a rating of 9/10.

Music and lyrics 

The group creates a fusion between heavy metal and traditional Mongolian music by introducing specific sounds related to the use of traditional instruments such as the morin khuur, the Russian balalaika, or the Jaw harp.

Depending on the songs, the genre of the music can vary from folk to folk rock to folk metal and even punk according to reviewers.

The lyrics of the songs evoke Mongolian nature, history, tales, legends and mythologies (especially those of Tengri, the chief Mongolian deity). The lyricist of the group, Askhan, also draws on family stories in some songs.

According to Askhan, while the first album is quite raw with no frills, the following are more mature and better worked with sequences, transitions and integration of traditional instruments.

The lyrics are written in Mongolian even when the titles are in English.

The group also uses techniques of Mongolian throat singing.

Members

Current 
 Askhan Avagchuud [阿斯汗] – guitars, vocals (2010- )
 Tsog [朝克] – morin khuur, backing vocals (2010- )
 Orgil [敖瑞峰] – bass, backing vocals (2011- )
 Saina [赛娜] (also of M-Survivor) – balalaika, backing vocals (2015- ) 
 Namra – drums (2019- )

Former 
 Baisal [白斯樂] (also on Suld as Baisile) – drums (2010-2011)
 Alen [艾伦] (also on Hanggai as Allen) – balalaika (2010-2012)
 萨其尔 – samples (2012, only live)
 Ding Kai [丁凯] (also on Tengger Cavalry) – drums (2012-2019)
 Wiils [伟力斯] – balalaika (2012-2014)

Discography 
Studio albums
 十丈铜嘴 Arvan Ald Guulin Honshoor (2012)
 Nine Treasures (2013)
 Wisdom Eyes (2017)
 Awakening from Dukkha (Compilation) (2021)
Live albums
Live in Beijing (2015)
Singles and EPs
Galloping White Horse (EP, 2015)
"Bodhicitta" (2019)
"Three-Year-Old Warrior" (2021)

References

External links 
 Nine Treasures on Metal Archives
 Nine Treasures on Folk-metal.nl
 Nine Treasures on Spirit of metal
 Nine Treasures on Discogs
 
 

2010 establishments in China
Chinese folk metal musical groups
Mongolian heavy metal musical groups
Musical groups established in 2010